The John G. Neihardt State Historic Site, also known as the Neihardt Center, is located in Bancroft, Nebraska, United States and features museum exhibits about Nebraska Poet Laureate John Neihardt.

The one-room study that Neihardt used from 1911 through 1920 as the place where he wrote many of his works is preserved at the site.  In 1970 the site was entered into the National Register of Historic Places, and is the only structure remaining from the original property.  The room has been furnished as if used by Neihardt, and visitors may view it from the open door.

The site is operated by the Nebraska State Historical Society and the John G. Neihardt Foundation, and also features the Sacred Hoop Prayer Garden, designed by Neihardt, and a library with materials about Neihardt's life and legacy. Special events include an annual Neihardt Day celebration.

The study was built in the early 1890s by August Hartman as a small house for use by his daughter and husband. It came into ownership of the Canarsky family c.1900. John G. Neihardt purchased a house nearby, close to his mother's house. He rented the study from about 1911 to 1921 from the Canarsky family for use as his office and library. In 1964 the study was purchased by the Bancroft Commercial Club from William Canarsky for $750, and it was restored in 1967 by the John G. Neihardt Foundation.

References

External links

 - Nebraska State Historical Society
John G. Neihardt State Historic Site - John G. Neihardt Foundation

Neihardt
Neihardt, John G., State Historic Site
Neihardt, John
Museums in Cuming County, Nebraska
State parks of Nebraska
Houses in Cuming County, Nebraska
Native American museums in Nebraska
National Register of Historic Places in Cuming County, Nebraska
History Nebraska